K. Virupakshappa (born 6 March 1942) is a member of the 14th Lok Sabha of India. He represents the Koppal constituency of Karnataka and is a member of the Indian National Congress (INC) political party.
in views barathiya Janata party

Social And Cultural Activities
Started many associations for the cause of social justice to uplift the poor and the backwards in Raichur District; associated with many schools and colleges including hostels for the poor boys and girls

Positions held
1960-1968 Municipal Councillor  
1994-1999 Member, Karnataka Legislative Assembly  
1996 onwards Vice President, Karnataka Pradesh Congress Committee  
2004 Elected to 14th Lok Sabha & Member, Committee on Human Resource Development

Some other positions
 Director, Vice President and President, Primary Land Development Co-operative Bank, Sindhanur, 1968–72
 President, (i) VSSN, Co-operative Bank, 1975–83; (ii) APMC, 1993–94; and (iii) Sri Kanakadasa Seva Sangha 1978 onwards
 State President, Kurubar Society; 1995–98
 District President, Kurubar Society, 1990–95; Director, Land Development Co-operative Society, 1978–80; chairman, TBP CADA, Munirabad, 2004
 Secretary, POIV Technic College, Rampur, Raichur, 1988–90
 Builder and President, Sri Kanakadas Pre University College, Primary and High School, Sindhanur
 Builder, Backward Community Hostel and Sangha started in 1978
 Member, APMC, 1968–78

External links
 Home Page on the Parliament of India's Website

1942 births
Indian National Congress politicians from Karnataka
Living people
India MPs 2004–2009
People from Raichur district
Lok Sabha members from Karnataka
People from Koppal district